The 2012 Asian Men's Junior Handball Championship (13th tournament) took place in Doha from June 30 – July 13. It acted as the Asian qualifying tournament for the 2013 Men's Junior World Handball Championship.

Draw

Preliminary round

Group A

Group B

Group C

Placement 13th/14th

Main round

Group A

Group B

Group C

Group D

Placement 11th/12th

Placement 7th–10th

Semifinals

9th/10th

7th/8th

Placement 5th/6th

Final round

Semifinals

Bronze medal match

Gold medal match

Final standing

References
www.goalzz.com
www.handball.jp

Handball
Asia
Asian Handball Championships
International handball competitions hosted by Qatar